The I've Had Enough 2023 or simply I've Had Enough is a liberal political party in Poland, founded by the wife of the PiS minister Łukasz Schreiber, Marianna Schreiber, on 11 May 2022 ahead of the 2023 parliamentary election.

References

Political parties established in 2022
Liberal parties in Poland